Waamwang (Wamoang) is an extinct Kanak language of New Caledonia, in the commune of Voh.

References

Languages of New Caledonia
Extinct languages of Oceania
New Caledonian languages